Károly Klimó (born 17 May 1936) is a Hungarian artist, one of the best known Hungarian artists of the present day. He is a non-figurative artist, member of the Széchenyi Academy of Literature and Arts.

Born in Békéscsaba, he studied art from 1956 to 1962 at the Hungarian University of Fine Arts, and had his first solo exhibition in 1977 in Budapest.  Thereafter, he undertook numerous trips abroad to study in several European countries, the United States, Iran, and South Korea.  In 1990, he became a professor at the Academy of Art in Budapest.  He  lives and works in Budapest in the area of the Disk Lake, as well as making frequent stays in Germany and Austria.  His work has been exhibited in dozens of solo and group exhibitions around the world, and some of his works are collected at, among other places: the State Art Gallery in Mannheim, Germany, the Albertina in Vienna, the Seoul Art Museum, and the Hungarian National Gallery in Budapest.

References
 www.klimokaroly.hu - Károly Klimó's official website.
 Karoly Klimo, Bilder und Zeichnungen, Munich: Matthes & Seitz Verlag, 1998, 
 Klimó Károly (mit einem Vorwort von László F. Földényi),

Gallery

Awards (selection) 

 Mihály Munkácsy Award (1972)
 Merited Artist (1998)
Herder Prize (2005)

1936 births
Living people
Hungarian painters
Herder Prize recipients